Moshi may be:
 Old Moshi language, the prestige variety of the Chaga languages of Tanzania
 Mossi language, the national language of Burkina Faso